Pogonophryne is a genus of marine ray-finned fishes belonging to the family Artedidraconidae, the barbeled plunderfishes. They are native to the Southern Ocean.

Taxonomy 
Pogonophryne was first described as a genus in 1914 by the English ichthyologist Charles Tate Regan when he described a new species of fish, Pogonophryne scotti, which had been collected on the Terra Nova Expedition in the Ross Sea. P. scotti is, therefore, the type species of Pogonophryne by monotypy. The genus name is a compound of pogonos meaning "beard", a reference to the barbel on the chin of P. scotti, and "phryne" which means "toad", possibly an allusion to the bumps and knobs on the head, like the skin of a toad.

Species
There are currently 28 recognized species in this genus:
 Pogonophryne albipinna Eakin, 1981 (White-fin plunderfish)
 Pogonophryne barsukovi Andriashev, 1967 (Stub-beard plunderfish)
 Pogonophryne bellingshausenensis Eakin, Eastman & Matallanas, 2008 (Spot-less nape plunderfish)
 Pogonophryne brevibarbata Balushkin, Petrov & Prut'ko, 2011 (Short-beard plunderfish)
 Pogonophryne cerebropogon Eakin & Eastman, 1998 (Brain-beard plunderfish)
 Pogonophryne dewitti Eakin, 1988 (Dewitt's plunderfish)
 Pogonophryne eakini Balushkin, 1999 (Eakin's plunderfish)
 Pogonophryne favosa Balushkin & Korolkova, 2013 
 Pogonophryne fusca  Balushkin & Eakin, 1998 (Dusky plunderfish)
 Pogonophryne immaculata  Eakin, 1981 (Spot-less plunderfish)
 Pogonophryne lanceobarbata  Eakin, 1987 (Lance-beard plunderfish)
 Pogonophryne macropogon  Eakin, 1981 (Great-beard plunderfish)
 Pogonophryne maculiventrata Spodareva & Balushkin, 2014 (Spot-belly plunderfish) 
 Pogonophryne marmorata Norman, 1938 (Marbled plunderfish)
 Pogonophryne mentella Andriashev, 1967 (Long-beard plunderfish)
 Pogonophryne neyelovi Shandikov & Eakin, 2013 (Hop-beard plunderfish)  
 Pogonophryne orangiensis  Eakin & Balushkin, 1998 (Orange-beard plunderfish)
 Pogonophryne pallida Balushkin & Spodareva, 2015 (Pale plunderfish) 
 Pogonophryne pavlovi Balushkin, 2013 (Pavlov's plunderfish) 
 Pogonophryne permitini Andriashev, 1967 (Fine-spotted plunderfish)
 Pogonophryne platypogon  Eakin, 1988 (Flat-beard plunderfish)
 Pogonophryne sarmentifera Balushkin & Spodareva, 2013 
 Pogonophryne scotti Regan, 1914 (Saddle-back plunderfish)
 Pogonophryne skorai Balushkin & Spodareva, 2013 
 Pogonophryne squamibarbata  Eakin & Balushkin, 2000 (Scale-beard plunderfish)
 Pogonophryne stewarti  Eakin, Eastman & Near, 2009 (Stewart's plunderfish)
 Pogonophryne tronio Shandikov, Eakin & Usachev, 2013 (Turquoise plunderfish) 
 Pogonophryne ventrimaculata  Eakin, 1987 (Spot-belly plunderfish)

Characteristics
Pogonophryne plunderfishes have a broad head which is flattened with post-temporal ridges which vary from weakly to well developed. They have a snout which is longer than the diameter of the eye and a broad space between the eyes. The mental barbel, the barbel on the chin which characterises the barbeled plunderfishes, is tapered to a point or expanded at its tip to a varying extent and frequently has branched or simple processes. The pper lateral line has tubular scales at the front and disc-shaped scales towards the back. The middle lateral line normally has disc¬shaped scales to the front and tubular scales to the rear, frequently these are  interspersed with disc-shaped scales.

Distribution, habitat and biology
Pogonophryne plunderfishes are found in the Southern Ocean around Antarctica reaching as far north as the South Shetland Islands. Their biology is little known but they are known to feed on polychaetes and crustaceans such as mysids, isopods and copepods.

References

Artedidraconidae
Taxa named by Charles Tate Regan
Marine fish genera